Richard Holt may refer to:
Richard Holt (MP for Langbaurgh) (1931–1991), British Conservative Member of Parliament
Richard Holt (cricketer) (1920–2001), English cricketer
Sir Richard Durning Holt (1868–1941), British Liberal Party politician, MP for Hexham
Richard Holt (died 1710), MP for Lymington, and for Petersfield 
Ric Holt, computer science professor
Ashton Dearholt (1894–1942), American silent film actor

See also
Holt (surname)